Chris Andrew Oxspring (born 13 May 1977) is an Australian professional baseball pitcher who has played Major League Baseball, Nippon Professional Baseball, KBO League, and currently plays in the Australian Baseball League (ABL) for the Sydney Blue Sox.

Career
Oxspring joined the Hanshin Tigers in Nippon Professional Baseball (NPB) for the 2006 season. On 15 December 2006, Oxspring signed a minor league contract with the Milwaukee Brewers. On 10 July 2007, his contract with the Brewers was sold to the LG Twins of the Korea Baseball Organization just one day before serving as the Pacific Coast League's starting pitcher in the 2007 Triple-A All-Star Game.

Internationally, Oxspring was a star for Australia in the 2004 Olympics, pitching 2–0 with wins both against Japan, earning him a silver medal.

Oxspring had the honor of throwing out the first official pitch of the Australian Baseball League to catcher Andrew Graham when the Blue Sox played the Canberra Cavalry on 6 November 2010. Oxspring threw six shutout innings in a game Sydney won 1–0.

On 8 December 2010, while playing with the Sydney Oxspring signed a minor league deal with an invitation to Spring training with the Detroit Tigers. At the end of the 2010–11 Australian Baseball League regular season, he led the league in innings pitched (68.2), game started (11) and strikeouts (71).

In June 2011, Detroit released Oxspring after struggling for their AAA affiliate, the Toledo Mud Hens conceding a 6.53 ERA over 20.2 innings. He shortly after signed with independent team the Somerset Patriots for the remainder of 2011.

In 2013 and 2014, Oxspring played with the Lotte Giants of the KBO League. In 2015, he played with the KT Wiz. From 2016 to 2018, he had served as a pitching coach for the Lotte Giants. On 3 December 2018 Oxspring announced that he will no longer coach the Giants and return to Australia to reunite with his family.

Oxspring returned to the Blue Sox for the 2022–23 Australian Baseball League season at 45 years old and became the oldest Australian born player to play in the league’s history, making the most appearances in his career since the 2012–13 Australian Baseball League season. He overtook 44 year old Brendan Kingman who pitched one inning in the 2017–18 Australian Baseball League season and is the second oldest player to appear in the league after Dae-sung Koo who made two single appearances at age 48 and 53.

References

External links 
 
 Career statistics and player information from Korea Baseball Organization
 
 

1977 births
Living people
Australian expatriate baseball players in Japan
Australian expatriate baseball players in South Korea
Australian expatriate baseball players in the United States
Baseball coaches
Baseball players at the 2004 Summer Olympics
Cook County Cheetahs players
Fort Wayne Wizards players
Hanshin Tigers players
KBO League pitchers
KT Wiz players
Lake Elsinore Storm players
LG Twins players
Lotte Giants players
Major League Baseball pitchers
Major League Baseball players from Australia
Medalists at the 2004 Summer Olympics
Mobile BayBears players
Nashville Sounds players
Nippon Professional Baseball pitchers
Olympic baseball players of Australia
Olympic medalists in baseball
Olympic silver medalists for Australia
Peoria Javelinas players
Portland Beavers players
San Diego Padres players
Somerset Patriots players
Sydney Blue Sox players
Toledo Mud Hens players
2009 World Baseball Classic players
2013 World Baseball Classic players
2017 World Baseball Classic players